One More Chance is a 1983 film written and directed by Sam Firstenberg. The film marks his directorial debut.

Plot summary
An ex-con returns home to find that his family left and he has no idea where they went.  Only a neighbor knows where they moved, but does not want to give him the information until he can show that he has changed.

Principal cast

External links 

1983 films
Golan-Globus films
Films directed by Sam Firstenberg
1983 directorial debut films
1980s English-language films